The North Bay Breakers were an American soccer team based in Santa Rosa, California.

They joined the USISL in 1994 and moved to the USISL Premier League in 1995.

Year-by-year

Soccer clubs in the San Francisco Bay Area
Sports in Santa Rosa, California
Sports in Sonoma County, California
Defunct Premier Development League teams